Vaejovis is a genus of scorpions.

Species
 Vaejovis bandido Graham, Ayrey & Bryson, 2012
 Vaejovis brysoni Ayrey & Webber, 2013
 Vaejovis carolinianus (Beavois, 1855)
 Vaejovis cashi Graham, 2007
 Vaejovis confusus Stahnke, 1940
 Vaejovis crumpi Ayrey & Soleglad, 2011
 Vaejovis deboerae Ayrey, 2009
 Vaejovis electrum Hughes, 2011
 Vaejovis eusthenura (Wood, 1863)
 Vaejovis feti Graham, 2007
 Vaejovis franckei Sissom, 1989
 Vaejovis grahami Ayrey & Soleglad, 2014
 Vaejovis grayae Ayrey, 2014
 Vaejovis granulatus Pocock, 1898
 Vaejovis halli Ayrey, 2012
 Vaejovis hirsuticauda Banks, 1910
 Vaejovis islaserrano Barrales-Alcalá et al, 2018
 Vaejovis jonesi Stahnke, 1940
 Vaejovis lapidicola Stahnke, 1940
 Vaejovis mexicanus Kock, 1836
 Vaejovis montanus Graham, 2010
 Vaejovis nayarit Armas & Eliezer Martin, 2001
 Vaejovis pattersoni Williams, 1980
 Vaejovis paysonensis Soleglad, 1973
 Vaejovis punctipalpi (Wood, 1863)
 Vaejovis puritanus Gertsch, 1958
 Vaejovis spinigerus (Wood, 1863)
 Vaejovis subcristatus Pocock, 1898
 Vaejovis tenuipalpus Sissom, Hughes, Bryson & Prendini, 2012
 Vaejovis trinityae Ayrey, 2013
 Vaejovis vorhiesi Stahnke, 1940
 Vaejovis waeringi Williams, 1970

References
 Encyclopedia of Life entry

A new Sky Island species of Vaejovis C. L. Koch, 1836 from Sonora, Mexico

Vaejovidae
Scorpion genera